Dan Guterman is a Canadian television writer and producer based in the United States. He was a writer for the satirical website The Onion between 1999 and 2010. He has also worked on The Colbert Report, Community, and Rick and Morty. Guterman has won two Emmy Awards: one in 2013 for his work on The Colbert Report and one in 2018 for his work on season three of Rick and Morty. He also won an Annie Award in 2018 for co-writing the Rick and Morty episode "The Ricklantis Mixup".

Life and career
Born in Brazil, Guterman became interested in comedy after watching Saturday Night Live and The Kids in the Hall when he moved to Montreal at age 7 —shows that, he said, "genuinely frightened me," as comedy in Brazil was mostly lighthearted in tone.

Having become a writer himself, Guterman later described his profession in writing comedy by saying, "You’re doing this very creative, often very personal thing, but you’re expected to produce it in this totally noncreative way. My job is to churn out comedy, which is this intangible and temperamental thing, but at the rate and consistency of an assembly-line worker.". After establishing his television writing presence as a writer on The Colbert Report and receiving an Emmy, Guterman began work with Dan Harmon on Community for its fifth season. This relationship continued, and in 2015 Guterman went on to write for both the sixth and second seasons of Community and Rick and Morty, respectively. He then continued work writing for Rick and Morty's third season, writing the Ricklantis Mixup episode and assisting on several others. Guterman co-wrote "Morty's Mind Blowers," which is referenced within the episode as the replacement to "Interdimensional Cable".

In 2018, Guterman was brought in as a consultant to work on Inside Job, a new animated show for NETFLIX. 

Guterman has also worked on At Home With Amy Sedaris and Another Period, as well as various films. 

In addition to his television writing career, Guterman has penned short pieces of writing called "New Optical Illusions" for The New Yorker.

Credits
Print
The Onion (1999–2010) – writer, head writer
Our Dumb World: The Onion's Atlas of the Planet Earth, 73rd Edition (2007)
America Again: Re-Becoming the Greatness We Never Weren't (2012)
The Onion Book of Known Knowledge: A Definitive Encyclopaedia Of Existing Information (2013)
Television
The Colbert Report (2011–14) – writer
Community (2014–15) – executive story editor, writer
"Bondage and Beta Male Sexuality"
"Basic RV Repair and Palmistry"
Rick and Morty (2015–17) – producer, co-executive producer, writer
"The Ricks Must Be Crazy"
"Interdimensional Cable 2: Tempting Fate" (with Ryan Ridley & Justin Roiland)
"The Ricklantis Mixup" (with Ryan Ridley)
"Morty's Mind Blowers" (with Mike McMahan, James Siciliano, Ryan Ridley, Justin Roiland, & Dan Harmon)

References

External links

American male writers
Date of birth missing (living people)
Living people
Primetime Emmy Award winners
American male television writers
Year of birth missing (living people)